Daniels Town Hall (formerly known as Mudhen Lake Lutheran Church) is a historic building in Daniels, Wisconsin.

Swedish Lutherans built this church at Mud Hen Lake in 1886, but the congregation moved in 1893. The building has been the Daniels Town Hall ever since. It was added to the National Register in 2006.

References

Lutheran churches in Wisconsin
City and town halls on the National Register of Historic Places in Wisconsin
Churches completed in 1892
Buildings and structures in Burnett County, Wisconsin
National Register of Historic Places in Burnett County, Wisconsin
City and town halls in Wisconsin